The 1943 West Virginia Mountaineers football team was an American football team that represented West Virginia University as an independent during the 1943 college football season. In its seventh non-consecutive season under head coach Ira Rodgers, the team compiled a 4–3 record and outscored opponents by a total of 124 to 79. The team played its home games at Mountaineer Field in Morgantown, West Virginia. Robert Dutton was the team captain.

Schedule

References

West Virginia
West Virginia Mountaineers football seasons
West Virginia Mountaineers football